Vishnumoorthy Theyyam is a Thiyya community temple ritual form of dance worship in Kerala and Karnataka, India. Theyyam consisted of several thousand-year-old traditions, rituals and customs. The performance includes complicated rites and rituals. The peculiar drum-beats can be heard up to a distance of 2 km from where the performance of the Vishnumoorthi Theyyam takes place. The enactment involving the Narasimha Avatar of Lord Vishnu by the Koladhari especially thrills the devotees and the spectators as a result of the body movements involved in it.

Story of Vishnumoorthi 

The most popular part of the Vaishnava Theyyam is the depiction of Vishnumoorthi. It is associated with Nileshwar and Jeppu Kudupady - Mangalore. It tells the story of Palanthai Kannan, a great devotee of Lord Vishnu. Palanthai Kannan, a native of Nileshwar in his boyhood, tried to pick mangoes from a mango tree owned by Kuruvat Kurup. Without considering his age or the thirst for food, Kuruvat Kurup and his bodyguards beat him and drove away from Nileshwar. After that incident, Palanthai Kannan went to Jeppu Kudupady - Mangalore, kunchadka - Sullia and took shelter in a Vishnu temple there. When there, he obtained the blessings of Lord Vishnu and years later, he returned to his homeland, Nileshwar. On the way, Palanthai Kannan stayed one day in Moolapally in the house of a blacksmith [now near the railway line] and rested in the Kanakkappalli Anikkil Tharavadu [situated near the Nileshwar bus stand, on the Koroth - N.H. Road, and once up on a time famous as a center of martial arts and education]. Then he proceeded to Kundon Kadavu and leaving his Olakkuda [umbrella] and Churika [shield], went to Kadalikulam [a pond near Nileshwar Market junction] for taking bath. Within a short time the news of the arrival of Palanthai Kannan spread in the all across Nileshwar. Hearing the news, Kuruvat Kurup and his men came to the Kadalikulam and killed Palanthai Kannan. The God Vishnu who accompanied his ardent devotee Palanthai Kannan was provoked and destroyed the everything near by Kuruvat tharavad.Kuruvat kurup was frightened and called up an astrologer. He identified the presence of God and advised Kurup to a make a Kettikkolam for lord Vishnu and build a shrine for the God.Kuruvat kurup and his family members build a shrine for the god Vishnu by carrying stones by themselves and also made a Kettikkolam for the God. That time onward, he became known as the Vishnumoorthi and began to reside in Vaikundeswara Temple, Kottappuram, Nileshwar. Vishnumoorthi theyyam is also believed to be The Narasinha Avatar  of Lord Mahavishnu who came to save his dear devotee Prahlada from his father, The Asura king Hiranya Kasipu by breaking the pillar. This Theyyakolam is dancing all major maniyani (Yadava's Tharavadu, Theeyya  and Nair Tharavadu). This kolam was worn by Malayan in special community. This Theyyakolam is dancing Edakkad Nadal, the Chalil Vishnu Moorthy temple, Nambiar family Chalil Veluva is following the same Theyakolam in Chalil Vishnumoorthy in Edakkad, Nadal every year in February.Marathakkad sri iver paradevatha kshethram,kuppam,taliparamba on makaram 25 to makaram 28.Kanavath vishnnumoorthy kshethram,kannapuram, mottammal, kannur.Sree Vishnu Murthy temple, Cheemeni ( Cheemeni Mundya )is a famous Kavu of Vishnumurthy .Thousands of devotees visiting there during the period of Kaliyattam. Devotees believe that Bajanamirikkal at Cheemeni Mundya is a remedy for snake bite and skin disease.This theyyam is also performed in all major Muchilot Kavu as an upadevatha of Muchilot Bhagavathi.

Legend of Vishnumoorthi Theyyam 
The Theyyam in question is a divine representation of Palanthai Kannan, a follower of Lord Vishnu and member of the lower caste, performed by individuals belonging to the Malaya clan. The story of Palanthai Kannan goes back to his childhood in Neeleswaram, where he tended to cattle and ate mangoes from a tree owned by Kuruvat Nair, a member of the upper caste. Kuruvat Nair's servants brutally beat the boy, leading him to flee the village and seek refuge in a Vishnu temple in Mangalore, where he lived for 12 years.

Eventually, Lord Vishnu instructed Palanthai Kannan to return to Neeleswaram. Upon his return, he bathed in a pond reserved for the upper caste, which angered Kuruvat Nair and his followers. They subsequently murdered Palanthai Kannan, and as a result, Kuruvat Nair faced numerous problems. An astrologer declared that Lord Vishnu was displeased with the death of his devotee and ordered a kolam to be performed. Additionally, a temple was to be constructed in honor of the Vishnumoorthi who had accompanied Palanthai Kannan from Mangalore, and the deity was to be worshipped.

Where does Vishnumoorthi Theyyam take place 
The Theyyam of Vishnumoorthi is a customary practice at numerous temples, Kavus, and households where Theyyam is a part of the tradition. The deity Vishnumoorthi is situated at the Vaikunteshwara temple in Kottapuram, Neeleswaram.

Vishnumoorthi in Ottakolams 

Ottakkolam is very famous in the payyannur area. Kinathil arayalin keezhil and annur kurinji temple are famous for the yearly festival featuring Ottakkolam. 
In Ottakolams, [meaning only one Theyyam] Vishnumoorthi Theyyam enters into the pyre and returns amongst the midst of the devotees [known as Agnipravesam]. It is repeated several times and it is believed that performing this act 104 times helped the Koladhari to become a Panikker. In April 2008, Ottakkolam was performed in a grand manner in Velu Vayal Ottakkuthiru, Nileshwar with the presence of thousands of devotees after a gap of 47 years. It is associated with Veethuveppu [a rite related to agriculture]. Four people take kayar [rope] from Vishnumoorthi and become Kayattukar. Their duty is to protect agricultural land from cattle. With the kayar [rope] and vadi [rod] they roam the area from Karyamkode to Thalachai and catch them with the kayar or drive them away using the vadi.

References

External links 

Theyyam